USS Robinson may refer to more than one United States Navy ship:

 , a destroyer in commission from 1918 to 1922
 , a destroyer in commission from 1944 to 1964
 USS Jack C. Robinson (DE-671), a destroyer escort converted during construction into the high-speed transport 
 , a high-speed transport in commission from 1945 to 1946

United States Navy ship names